The 1997–98 LEN Champions League was the 35th edition of LEN's premier competition for men's water polo clubs. It ran from  1997 to 6 June 1998, and it was contested by 16 teams. The Final Four (semifinals, final, and third place game) took place on June 5 and June 6 in Zagreb.

Preliminary round

Blue Group

Red Group

Final Four (Zagreb)

Final standings

See also
1997–98 LEN Cup Winners' Cup
1997–98 LEN Cup

LEN Champions League seasons
1997 in water polo
1998 in water polo
Champions League